Alhaji Akanni Olayinka Quadri (born 6 September 1959) is a Nigerian actor, film maker, Producer and Director, born and raised in Lagos Island, Lagos State, but a native of Oro, Kwara State. He recently starred in a new movie titled Apaadi. He is installed as the Agba Akin of Oro Kingdom. He is the President & Co-Founder of a Theatre Art Group called (Odunfa Caucus) whose office is Situated in Ebute-Meta, Lagos State.

Early life and education
Yinka, a descent of Igbomina-Owomeje, Kwara State, was born into a middle-class family in September 1959 in Lagos Island, Lagos State.

Education 
He completed his primary school education and secondary school education at St. Catholic School, Idumagbo, Lagos and Christ High School, Ebute Elefun, Lagos respectively.

Career
Yinka's who is also known as Fagbamila acting career started in 1976 when he and Taiwo Olayinka along with a group of friends formed a drama group called Afopina Theatre Group after dropping out of school. He has starred in over 90 Yoruba films since his debut television series titled Agbodorogun. On April 27, 2014, Yinka launched his biography Yinka Quadri: Scent of a Legend and simultaneously celebrated his 36 years in the Nigerian film industry.

Selected filmography

Olaniyonu
Kutupu
Kura
Ekun
Agbodorogun
Ojiji
Egbinrin Ote
Araba
Ilari
Odun Baku
Bolode O'ku
Èebúdolá Tèmi
Abeni
Apaadi
Ojo Idajo
Abulesowo
Niwoyi Ola
Ilekun Olorun
Okinni
Owo Blow
Shola Arikusa

Awards and nominations

See also
List of Yoruba people

References

External links

1959 births
Living people
Nigerian male film actors
Yoruba male actors
People from Kwara State
Male actors in Yoruba cinema
Male actors from Lagos
20th-century Nigerian male actors
21st-century Nigerian male actors
Nigerian male television actors
Nigerian film directors
Nigerian film producers
Actors from Kwara State